Notable people with the surname Griscom include:

 Betsy Ross, probably apocryphal designer of the American flag, born Elizabeth Phoebe Griscom
 Clement Griscom, American shipping magnate, father of Frances C. Griscom
 Deborah Griscom Passmore, American botanical illustrator
 Frances C. Griscom, American amateur golfer, daughter of Clement Griscom
 John Griscom, American educator
 Ludlow Griscom, American ornithologist
 Lloyd Carpenter Griscom, American diplomat
 Mary Wade Griscom, American physician and medical school professor
 Nina Griscom, American model, television host, designer, columnist and businesswoman
 Tom Griscom, American newspaper editor
 William Woodnut Griscom, American electrical engineer and founder of the Electro-Dynamic Company